On May 15, 2006, the United States Department of Defense acknowledged that there have been 12 Tajik detainees held in Guantanamo.
The Guantanamo Bay detainment camps were opened on January 11, 2002, at the Guantanamo Bay Naval Base, in Cuba.

Press reports
The magazine Mother Jones published a feature article, entitled: "The Man Who Has Been to America: One Guantanamo detainee's story".  
The article was based on an interview with Muhibullo Abdulkarim Umarov, a Tajik from a village named Alisurkhon.
Umarov said he and a neighbor from his village, were captured while visiting a third neighbor from his village at his University in Pakistan.
Umarov named his two neighbors, Mazharudin and Abdughaffor.  He said they too had been sent to Guantanamo.  Mazharudin is named on the official list, but Abdughaffor is not.
Umarov told Mother Jones that Mazharudin and Abdughaffor were released on March 31, 2004, at the same time he was.

The US Department of Defense acknowledged holding twelve Tajiks in Guantanamo.
The DoD acknowledged convening Combatant Status Review Tribunals for six of the Tajiks held in Guantanamo.
The DoD said they convened a Combatant Status Review Tribunal for every detainee who was still in Guantanamo in 2005.

A March 1, 2007, press release announced that the Department of Defense had returned three Tajiks back to Tajikistan.

On August 7, 2007, Radio Free Europe reported that a former Tajik detainee named "Mukit Vohidov" had been repatriated from Guantanamo to Tajikistani custody, in March 2007, and was about to stand trial.
The report also stated that another former Tajik detainee named "Ibrohim Nasriddinov" had recently stood trial, been convicted, and received a 23-year sentence.

List of Tajiks held in Guantanamo

References

Terrorism in Tajikistan
Tajikistani
Tajikistani extrajudicial prisoners of the United States
Tajikistan–United States relations